Svijet je lopta šarena is the seventh studio album recorded and released by the Sarajevo band Crvena jabuka. It was recorded through 1997 and released near the middle of 1998.

Music on this album

The most popular ballads on the album are "Vjetar" (The Wind), and "Stizu me sjećanja" (Memories are Coming to Me).

Track listing

 
 
 Mozart
 
 
 Jukebox

Band members

Darko Jelčić: drums, percussion
Danijel Lastrić: keyboards
Krešimir Kaštelan: bass 
Dražen Žerić: vocals
Nikša Bratoš: harmonica, clarinet, keyboards, synthesizer, guitar
Mario Vukušić Jimmy: guitar

More band members

Additional personal includes Darija Hodnik, Jana Nemček and Mirza who sang background vocals on track 8.

1998 albums
Crvena jabuka albums